Bluffdale is a city in Salt Lake and Utah counties in the U.S. state of Utah, located about  south of Salt Lake City.  As of the 2020 census, the city population was 17,014.

From 2011 to 2013, the National Security Agency's (NSA) data storage center, the Utah Data Center, was constructed at Camp Williams in Bluffdale.  It is approximately 1 million square feet in size.

History
Bluffdale, named for its geography of bluffs and dales, was first settled in 1848–1849, when the area was originally part of West Jordan. On July 29, 1858, Orrin Porter Rockwell paid five- hundred dollars to Evan M. Green for sixteen acres of land near the Crystal Hot Lakes (adjacent to the present Utah State Prison). This land included Hot Springs Hotel and Brewery with dining facilities, a stable brewery, and a pony express station. As the community expanded, the Bluffdale area became part of South Jordan, then Riverton. In 1883 the Bluffdale School Precinct was formed from parts of Herriman, South Jordan, and Draper. On August 1, 1886, the Bluffdale Ward of The Church of Jesus Christ of Latter-day Saints was organized with Lewis H. Mousley as Bishop. For a short time, the town was called Mousley. Seven irrigation canals originate at the Jordan Narrows in the Bluffdale area and serve the Salt Lake Valley. One of the earliest was Utah, and Salt Lake Canal started in 1862. Some of the early buildings included an adobe church, built in 1887–1888, a tithing house, and a three-room schoolhouse constructed in 1893. The city was incorporated in 1978.

Geography
Bluffdale has an area of 10.22 square miles (26.47km) and an average elevation of 4,436 feet (1,352 m) above sea level. Bluffdale is predominately located in Salt Lake County, though a portion of the city is in Utah County. Bluffdale shares city borders with Herriman to the west, Riverton to the north, Draper to the east, and Lehi to the south.

Bluffdale is surrounded by wide open spaces with dramatic views of the Wasatch and Oquirrh Mountain Ranges. The Salt Lake Valley floor is the ancient lakebed of Lake Bonneville, which existed at the end of the last Ice Age. Several Lake Bonneville shorelines can be distinctly seen on the foothills or benches of nearby mountains. The Jordan River flows through the city and is a drainage of Utah Lake that empties into the Great Salt Lake.

Climate
The climate of Bluffdale is semi-arid. Under the Köppen climate classification, Bluffdale has a hot-summer humid continental climate (Dfa) with hot summers and cold, snowy winters.

Parks
The largest park in Bluffdale is Wardle Fields Regional Park, part of the Salt Lake County Parks system. At 40 acres, the park caters to the recreational needs of the region by providing a splash pad, a 25-foot tall watchtower, pickleball and basketball courts, bouldering walls, zip lines, and other amenities.

City Parks
Bluffdale has a system of 13 parks. Some of the most notable are: 
 Bluffdale City Main Park (22.37 acres) is the city's largest park and features two pavilions, 16 picnic tables, a trail, and sports fields.
 Vintage Park (6.37 acres) is one of the city's newest parks and features pavilions and picnic tables, pickleball and tennis courts, and a splash pad. 
 Independence Park (5.73 acres) features a splash pad, pavilion, and a variety of play equipment.
 Parry Farms Park (5.63 acres) 
 Phillip Gates Memorial Park (4.54 acres) 
 Mount Jordan Park (3.69 acres)

Trails
The City hosts a variety of beautiful and well-maintained trails weaving through and around the city. A significant portion of the Jordan River Parkway Trail, a 40-mile trail crossing three counties, goes through Bluffdale. The City's trail system includes cycling, pedestrian, and equestrian routes.

Demographics

Bluffdale is part of the Salt Lake City, Utah Metropolitan Statistical Area.

As of the census of 2010, there were 7,598 people, 1,966 households, and 1,719 families residing in the city. The population density was 743.5 people per square mile. There were 2,059 housing units at an average density of 201.5 per square mile. The racial makeup of the city was 95.8% White, 0.4% African American, 0.3% Native American, 0.4% Asian, 0.3% Pacific Islander, 1.1% from other races, and 1.8% from two or more races. Hispanic or Latino of any race were 4.4% of the population.

There were 1,966 households, out of which 57.8% had children under 18 living with them, 74.7% were married couples living together, 8.7% had a female householder with no husband present, and 12.6% were non-families. Of all households, 9.8% were made up of individuals, and 14.0% had someone living alone who was 65 years of age or older. The average household size was 3.86, and the average family size was 4.15.

In the city, the population was spread out, with 38.2% under 18, 9.7% from 18 to 24, 25.1% from 25 to 44, 21.6% from 45 to 64, and 5.3% who were 65 years of age or older. The median age was 26 years. For every 100 females, there were 100.2 males.

The average household income in the city was US$67,392, and the average family income was US$78,180.

Government
Bluffdale is part of Utah's 4th congressional district represented by Republican Burgess Owens (2020).

City Administration

Economy
Camp Williams is located in Bluffdale.

Utah Data Center

The Utah Data Center, also known as the Intelligence Community Comprehensive National Cybersecurity Initiative Data Center, is a data storage facility for the United States Intelligence Community that is designed to be a primary storage resource capable of storing data on the scale of yottabytes (1 yottabyte = 1 trillion terabytes, or 1 quadrillion gigabytes). Its purpose – as the name implies – is to support the Comprehensive National Cybersecurity Initiative (CNCI), including storing details of people's mobile phone and internet use, though its precise mission is secret. The National Security Agency (NSA), which will lead operations at the facility, is the executive agent for the Director of National Intelligence. It is located at Camp Williams.

The structure is 1 million or 1.5 million square feet and cost $1.5 billion when it was completed in May 2014. One report suggested that it also cost another $2 billion for hardware, software, and maintenance. The facility is estimated to have a power demand of 65 megawatts, costing about $40 million per year.

Education

Schools
Bluffdale is in the Jordan School District. Within the city, there are five traditional public and four charter public schools. Bluffdale Elementary offers a Portuguese Dual Immersion program, while South Hills Middle School has been designated as a "School to Watch" by the National Forum to Accelerate Middle-Grades Reform. 

Traditional Public
 Bluffdale Elementary School
 Mountain Point Elementary School
 South Hills Middle School
 Hidden Valley Middle School
 Riverton High School

Charter Public
 North Star Academy (K-9)
 Summit Academy (Independence)
 Summit Academy (14400 South)
 Summit High School

Transportation

Roads
Bluffdale lies at the convergence of one major and two minor freeways: I-15, which runs north-to-south to the east of the city; Bangerter Highway, which runs east-to-west between Bluffdale and Riverton; and Mountain View Corridor, which runs north-to-south to the west of the City. Porter Rockwell Boulevard is a five-phase road project that will serve as an I-15 and Mountain View Corridor connection, the only east-to-west connection in the county.

Public transportation
Bluffdale has no public transportation system. The commuter rail system, FrontRunner, passes Bluffdale but does not have a stop there.

Air transportation

See also

 List of cities and towns in Utah
 Apostolic United Brethren – headquarters of this sect is in Bluffdale
 Utah State Prison located nearby

References

External links

 City of Bluffdale

Cities in Salt Lake County, Utah
Cities in Utah County, Utah
Salt Lake City metropolitan area
Populated places established in 1886
Cities in Utah
1886 establishments in Utah Territory
Provo–Orem metropolitan area